Cochinchinochloa is a genus of flowering plants belonging to the family Poaceae.

Its native range is Vietnam.

Species:
 Cochinchinochloa braiana H.N.Nguyen & V.T.Tran

References

Poaceae
Poaceae genera